Sam Carter may refer to:

 Samantha Carter, a fictional character in Stargate
 Sam Carter (athlete), Australian Paralympic athlete
 Sam Carter (musician), English folk musician
 Sam Carter (rugby union) (born 1989), Australian rugby union player
 Sam Carter, vocalist of the UK band Architects
 Sam Carter, a fictional character in Deus Ex
 Shanna Swendson, novelist using the pseudonym Samantha Carter

See also
Samuel Carter (disambiguation)